Corundum is a crystalline form of aluminium oxide typically containing traces of iron, titanium, vanadium and chromium. It is a rock-forming mineral. It is a naturally transparent material, but can have different colors depending on the presence of transition metal impurities in its crystalline structure. Corundum has two primary gem varieties: ruby and sapphire. Rubies are red due to the presence of chromium, and sapphires exhibit a range of colors depending on what transition metal is present. A rare type of sapphire, padparadscha sapphire, is pink-orange.

The name "corundum" is derived from the Tamil-Dravidian word kurundam (ruby-sapphire) (appearing in Sanskrit as kuruvinda).

Because of corundum's hardness (pure corundum is defined to have 9.0 on the Mohs scale), it can scratch almost all other minerals. It is commonly used as an abrasive on sandpaper and on large tools used in machining metals, plastics, and wood. Emery, a variety of corundum with no value as a gemstone, is commonly used as an abrasive. It is a black granular form of corundum, in which the mineral is intimately mixed with magnetite, hematite, or hercynite.

Geology and occurrence

Corundum occurs as a mineral in mica schist, gneiss, and some marbles in metamorphic terranes. It also occurs in low-silica igneous syenite and nepheline syenite intrusives. Other occurrences are as masses adjacent to ultramafic intrusives, associated with lamprophyre dikes and as large crystals in pegmatites. It commonly occurs as a detrital mineral in stream and beach sands because of its hardness and resistance to weathering. The record has since been surpassed by certain synthetic boules.

Corundum for abrasives is mined in Zimbabwe, Pakistan, Afghanistan, Russia, Sri Lanka, and India. Historically it was mined from deposits associated with dunites in North Carolina, US, and from a nepheline syenite in Craigmont, Ontario. Emery-grade corundum is found on the Greek island of Naxos and near Peekskill, New York, US. Abrasive corundum is synthetically manufactured from bauxite.

Four corundum axes dating to 2500 BC from the Liangzhou culture have been discovered in China.

Synthetic corundum
 In 1837, Marc Antoine Gaudin made the first synthetic rubies by reacting alumina at a high temperature with a small amount of chromium as a colourant.
 In 1847, J. J. Ebelmen made white synthetic sapphires by reacting alumina in boric acid.
 In 1877, Frenic and Freil made crystal corundum from which small stones could be cut.
 In 1903, Verneuil announced that he could produce synthetic rubies on a commercial scale using this flame fusion process.

The Verneuil process allows the production of flawless single-crystal sapphire and ruby gems of much larger size than normally found in nature. It is also possible to grow gem-quality synthetic corundum by flux-growth and hydrothermal synthesis. Because of the simplicity of the methods involved in corundum synthesis, large quantities of these crystals have become available on the market at a fraction of the cost of natural stones.

Apart from ornamental uses, synthetic corundum is also used to produce mechanical parts (tubes, rods, bearings, and other machined parts), scratch-resistant optics, scratch-resistant watch crystals, instrument windows for satellites and spacecraft (because of its transparency in the ultraviolet to infrared range), and laser components. For example, the KAGRA gravitational wave detector's main mirrors are  sapphires, and Advanced LIGO considered  sapphire mirrors. Corundum has also found use in the development of ceramic armour thanks to its high hardiness.

Structure and physical properties

The unit cell contains six formula units.

The toughness of corundum is sensitive to surface roughness and crystallographic orientation. It may be 6–7 MPa·m for synthetic crystals, and around 4 MPa·m for natural.

In the lattice of corundum, the oxygen atoms form a slightly distorted hexagonal close packing, in which two-thirds of the octahedral sites between the oxygen ions are occupied by aluminium ions. The structure of corundum is sometimes described as a pseudohexagonal structure.

Generalization

Because of its prevalence, corundum has also become the name of a major structure type (corundum type) found in various binary and ternary compounds.

See also

 Aluminium oxynitride
 Gemstone
 Spinel – natural and synthetic mineral often mistaken for corundum

References

Abrasives
Aluminium minerals
Corundum varieties
Hematite group
Industrial minerals
Luminescent minerals
Oxide minerals
Polymorphism (materials science)
Superhard materials
Trigonal minerals
Minerals in space group 167